Freedom Finance Investment Company is an investment company that is a part of Freedom Holdings (Nevada, USA), trading symbol FRHC. The company is engaged in investment banking, asset management, and capital markets services. Its main area of focus is in the American stock market, as well as the markets of Russia and Kazakhstan. Freedom Finance provides access to trading on the Moscow Exchange, Saint Petersburg exchange, Kazakhstan Stock Exchange (KASE), Tashkent Stock Exchange (UZSE), American stock markets (NYSE, NASDAQ, CBOE, CME, AMEX) and the European stock markets LSE and Euronext. It has offices in 32 cities in Russia, 16 cities in Kazakhstan, 12 cities in Ukraine, 8 cities in Uzbekistan, one office in Kyrgyzstan, one office in Germany, and one office in Cyprus. Freedom Holdings owns the Kazakh bank Freedom Finance, online store Freedom24 and Kazakhstani broker Freedom Finance JSC.

History 
The company was founded in 2008 by Timur Turlov. In 2013 Freedom Finance purchased Kazakhstani investment company and joined the national investment program People's IPO in Kazakhstan. In 2014 the company arranged for the listing of stock of Bank of America on KASE, and in 2015, listings of bonds of VTB Bank. Freedom Finance took part in the IPO of Alibaba and the private mining company BAST. In 2015 the Company became a market maker for stocks of KEGOC, and in 2016 it carried out an IPO for Aktobe Metalware Plant JSC, which holds 70% of the metalwork market in Kazakhstan. In 2017 the Company purchased the Kazakhstani broker company Asyl-Invest, listed in top three companies in ranking of the Kazakhstan stock exchange member's activity in the sector of "share securities" from 2009 to 2017.

In 2015, Freedom Finance passed under control of the company Freedom Holding Corp. (formerly known as BMB Munai, founded in 1981 in Nevada), with Timur Turlov becoming the majority shareholder of Freedom Holding Corp.

After participating in People's IPO in 2014 in Kazakhstan, as reported by the management of the company, 18,000 personal customers' accounts were opened (according to other sources - 23 000). Since January 2015, the company has been ranked first on the Kazakhstan stock exchange members activity  in the sector of "Share securities". As of March 2022, the company is on the top of the leading stock market operators of Kazakhstan.

As on 31 May 2017 the Company is a market maker for 12 securities: KEGOC, BAST, Aktobe Metalware Plant JSC, Bank of America, ETF S&P 500, VTB, Sberbank, Aeroflot, Gazprom, Rostelecom, Magnit, Uralkali.

In July 2017 Freedom Finance purchased the Ukrainian trader Ukranet, entering the market of Ukraine. As reported at the site of the U.S. Securities and Exchange Commission, the Ukrainian company is affiliated with the American holding Freedom Holding Corp.

In August 2017, the company announced the forthcoming initial public offer (IPO) on New York stock exchange (NYSE).

In 2018, Freedom Finance entered the Uzbekistani securities market, establishing offices in 8 cities of the country. In December 2018 they have done the IPO of Kokand mexanika zavodi JSC, in December 2019 the SPO of Kvarts JSC

In 2020 Freedom Holding Corp. acquired а Kazakh bank – Bank Kassa Nova JSC, the name of the bank was later changed to "Bank Freedom Finance Kazakhstan" JSC.

In 2021 Freedom Holding Corp. completed acquisition of american broker Prime Executions, Inc. The acquisition marked the company's initial entry into the U.S. markets.

In 2021 Freedom Holding Corp. entered an agreement to acquire another U.S. brokerage firm MKM Partners, LLC.

In 2021 Freedom Finance Europe received direct membership in Euroclear.

Operation 

The key specialization of the company is the American stock market where it provides direct access to trading on the USA stock exchange: NYSE, NASDAQ, CBOE, CME, AMEX, as well as Moscow and European exchanges LSE and Euronext. Its key operation areas are brokerage services, dealer operations, securities trust management, depository operation, Internet trading, using such platforms as Netinvestor and QUIK, underwriting. The company offers webinars, seminars, distant and resident courses in trading and renders expert services.

According to the Russian rating agency Expert RA (2021), the company's credit rating is "ruBBB", outlook — "stable".

Kazakh bank Freedom Finance JSC, Kazakh brokers Bank Freedom Finance Kazakhstan JSC and Freedom Finance Global PLC, and Cypriot broker Freedom Finance Europe Ltd. have long-term credit ratings at B- from S&P Global Ratings (2022).

References 

2008 establishments in Russia
Investment companies of Russia